Ekdara (Nepali: एकडारा ) is a rural municipality in Mahottari District in Province No. 2 of Nepal. It was formed in 2016 occupying current 6 sections (wards) from previous 6 former VDCs. It occupies an area of 24 km2 with a total population of 29,315.

References 

Populated places in Mahottari District
Rural municipalities of Nepal established in 2017
Rural municipalities in Madhesh Province